Rovtarske Žibrše is a dispersed settlement south of Rovte in the Municipality of Logatec in the Inner Carniola region of Slovenia.

References

External links
Rovtarske Žibrše on Geopedia

Populated places in the Municipality of Logatec